Charles Potts (born August 28, 1943) is an American counter-culture poet. He is sometimes referred to as a projectivist poet and was mentored by Edward Dorn. Raised in rural Mackay, Idaho, Potts left Pocatello, Idaho and Idaho State University in the mid '60s and set out for Seattle, Mexico, and ultimately the location where he rose to literary prominence: the countercultural hotbed of Berkeley, California.

There, he founded the Litmus literary magazine and the Litmus publishing company, which published his friend Charles Bukowski's book "Poems written before jumping out of an 8 story window". Potts' gives an account of his time as a revolutionary hippie in the Berkeley poetry scene, and a psychotic breakdown he suffered there, in his two-part memoir Valga Krusa.

In the '80s Potts moved to Walla Walla, Washington where he later founded The Temple bookstore, Tsunami Publishing, and The Temple Literary Magazine.

Potts' biography is also of record in the Marquis publications, Who's Who in America, 1977, Who's Who in the West, 1996, Who's Who in the World, 1996, and Who's Who in Finance and Industry, 1998.

Potts, better known as a poet, also won Manuscript's International's First Place Novel Award for Creative Excellence in 1991, for the Novel Loading Las Vegas. He was given a Distinguished Professional Achievement Award by the Alumni Association and the College of Arts and Sciences at Idaho State University in 1994. He has a Lifetime Achievement Award from the Washington Poets Association in 2008.

Also a singer/songwriter, Potts tapes and CDs recorded at Studio 13 in Salt Lake City and Bayside Audio in Austin, Texas, which is home to the Charles Potts Magic Windmill Band (named for him but in which he does not play) circulate underground. Various YouTube videos of his recordings were made by Bill Anderson.

A political and economic geographer, How the South Finally Won the Civil War: And Controls the Political Future of the United States, published in 1995, got a boost in recognition when the Harvard educated and Boston College professor of history, Heather Cox Richardson, published a similarly titled book, How the South Won the Civil War, with Oxford University Press in 2020.

Potts’ most recent book in The Fifth Convulsion: The Structure of American History.

Potts' collected works, letters, and publishing materials were housed in the archives of Utah State University's Merrill-Cazier Library in Logan, Utah in 2011.

Bibliography 
Books:

Coyote Highway, Least Bittern Books, Henry County, Kentucky, 2016
Pilgrim & Martel, Least Bittern Books, Henry County, Kentucky, 2015
The Source, Green Panda Press, Cleveland Heights, Ohio, 2014
Inside Idaho, Poems 1996-2007, West End Press, Albuquerque, New Mexico, 2009
The Yellow Christ, Valga Krusa Vol. 1, Green Panda Press, Cleveland Heights, Ohio, 2007
Laffing Water, Valga Krusa, vol. 2, Green Panda Press, Cleveland Heights, Ohio, 2007 
The Portable Potts, West End Press, Albuquerque, New Mexico, 2005
Kiot: Selected Early Poems, 1963–1977, Blue Begonia Press, Yakima, Washington, 2005
Compostrella/Starfield, Time Barn Books, Nashville, Tennessee, 2004
Across the North Pacific, Slough Press, College Station, Texas, 2002
Lucintite TM, Butcher Shop Press, Oneonta, New York 2002
Slash and Burn, Blue Begonia Press, with Robert McNeally, Yakima, Washington, 2001
Prophet/Profit, Poetnoise, with Chris Bodor, Beacon, New York, 2001
Nature Lovers, Pleasure Boat Studio, Bainbridge Island, Washington, 2000
Angio Gram, D Press, Sebastopol, California, 2000
Little Lord Shiva: The Berkeley Poems, 1968, Glass Eye Books, Northampton, Massachusetts, 1999
Lost River Mountain, Blue Begonia Press, Yakima, Washington, 1999
Fascist Haikus, Acid Press, Pocatello, Idaho, 1999
100 Years in Idaho, Tsunami Inc., Walla Walla, Washington, 1996
How the South Finally Won the Civil War, Tsunami Inc., 1995
Loading Las Vegas, Current, Walla Walla, Washington, 1991
The Dictatorship of the Environment, Druid Books, Milwaukee, Wisconsin, 1991
A Rite to the Body, Ghost Dance Press, East Lansing, Michigan, 1989
Rocky Mountain Man, (Selected Poems) The Smith, New York City, 1978
Valga Krusa, Litmus Inc., Salt Lake City, Utah, 1977
The Opium Must Go Thru, Litmus Inc., with illustrations by Robert McNeally, 1976
Charlie Kiot, Folk Frog Press,  Salt Lake City, Utah, 1976
The Golden Calf, Litmus Inc., Salt Lake City, Utah, 1975
The Trancemigraçion of Menzu, Empty Elevator Shaft Press, San Francisco, 1973
Waiting in Blood, Rainbow Resin Press, Salt Lake City, Utah, 1973
Blue up the Nile, Quixote, Madison, Wisconsin, 1972
The Litmus Papers, Gunrunner Press, Milwaukee, Wisconsin, 1969
Little Lord Shiva, Noh Directions, Berkeley, California, 1969
Burning Snake, Presna De Lagar, Portland, Oregon, 1967
Blues From Thurston County, Grande Ronde Press, La Grande, Oregon, 1966

References

External links

  The Charles Potts School of Thought, Action and Poetry

1943 births
American male poets
Living people
People from Idaho